Pizzo delle Pecore (2,381 m) is a mountain of the Swiss Lepontine Alps, located east of Cevio in the canton of Ticino. It lies just south of the slightly higher Cima di Broglio, on the range between the Valle Maggia and the Valle Verzasca.

References

External links
 Pizzo delle Pecore on Hikr

Mountains of the Alps
Mountains of Switzerland
Mountains of Ticino
Lepontine Alps